The University of Louisville Cardinal Marching Band is the official marching band of the University of Louisville (UofL) in Louisville, Kentucky. It is considered a Music Ambassador for UofL. The CMB performs at all home football games at Cardinal Stadium, all postseason bowl games, and select away football games. It also plays at the annual Spring Scrimmage Game which pits the Cardinal Offense against the Cardinal Defense.

The CMB is composed of students at the University of Louisville and surrounding Kentuckiana Metroversity institutions. Every member of the CMB receives a scholarship to perform with the ensemble. There are additional awards for the official CMB Bugler and Feature Twirler. The Cardinal Marching Band is a Major Ensemble course at the UofL School of Music and is the official band of the Kentucky Derby in which they are known for its nationally televised performances of My Old Kentucky Home every year.

Overview

During the university's Fall semester, the band rehearses from 4:30pm to 6:30pm on Mondays, Wednesdays, and Fridays. Membership includes the brass and woodwinds, drumline, the feature twirler, colorguard, and drum majors. It is composed of students at the university (music majors and non-music majors alike) as well as select students of other Metroversity colleges that don't have a marching band program of their own. Members receive both a college credit and a scholarship for participation. The band has performed on MTV and has had musical greats join them in performance such as world-renowned trumpeter, Wynton Marsalis. The group was chosen to perform for the Captain's Celebration of the 2008 Ryder Cup at the Valhalla Golf Club. The group has also been featured and/or written about on ESPN, FOX Sports, Good Morning America, ABC World News Tonight with Charlie Gibson, Inside Edition, and ABC's Extreme Makeover: Home Edition.

History

For over 70 years the Cardinal Marching Band has proudly represented the University of Louisville as the most visible ensemble of the School of Music, performing live for over half a million spectators each year. Creating vibrant game day traditions for Cardinal fans is at the core of the CMB, which performs at all home football games, select away games, and all bowl games.

The Cardinal Marching Band has been the "Official Band of the Kentucky Derby" since 1936 and has received national recognition through features on ESPN, ABC World News Tonight, Oprah, Sports Illustrated, Extreme Makeover: Home Edition, and the NFL Network. Additionally, the CMB has performed at 17 bowl games including the Russell Athletic, Sugar, Orange, Liberty, Belk, Beef O'Bradys, Gator, GMAC, Humanitarian, Motor City, Fiesta, Pasadena, and Sun Bowl.

The Cardinal Marching Band was formed in 1928 under the direction of E. J. Wotowa (composer "Hail Purdue!") and started performing at football games in 1933. In 1949, the band traveled to Hattiesburg, Mississippi to perform at the UofL vs. Southern Mississippi football game. It was at this game that the band had to abandon the claim of "Best Dressed Band in Dixie," after it was discovered another band held prior claim to that title. The UofL CMB then adopted the nickname "Marching Cardinals" which was shortened in 2011 to "Marching Cards."

Through the 1950s the CMB was extremely active, dazzling audiences with electrifying halftime shows featuring majorette Hilda Gay Mayberry who was named the most outstanding majorette in the country during the time! The 1960s marked the leadership of Robert B. Griffith, who wrote the fight song, Fight! UofL.

The band's membership gradually declined in the 1960s until their last performance in the fall of 1970. In 1978 Governor Julian Carroll offered to reestablish the Cardinal Marching Band. Since then, the band has grown to be an established part of UofL's school culture. The band has performed at every UofL Football game since 1979 and has been a vital part of the University of Louisville.

In 2011, Amy Acklin was appointed as the Associate Director of Bands & Cardinal Marching Band Director. In 2016, Jason Cumberledge was named Assistant Director of Bands & Assistant Cardinal Marching Band Director. Frederick Speck, Director of Bands, has overseen and provided vision for the program since 1995. Dr. Speck also wrote the arrangement of My Old Kentucky Home which the band plays during the pre-game show.

Every member of the CMB receives a scholarship to perform with the ensemble. There are additional scholarships for the official CMB Bugler and Feature Twirler.

Instruments and sections
 Drum Majors
 Twirlers
 Colorguard
 Flutes / Piccolos
 Clarinets
 Alto and Tenor Saxophones
 Trumpets
 Mellophones
 Trombones
 Baritones
 Sousaphones
 Drumline (Includes Snare line, Tenor line, Bass line, and Cymbal line)

Traditions

 The chanting and playing of the "CARDS" cheer to end every rehearsal. (refer to Track 12 of the band's 2007 Highlights CD, listed below)
 The playing of "Cardinal Circle," written by head director of bands, Dr. Fredrick Speck at the beginning of every rehearsal. 
 The President's Tent -- About 45 minutes before a home football game, the band marches to the school president's tent (located just outside the stadium) where many important guests to the school congregate before each game. While there, the band plays few school songs for the enjoyment of those in attendance.
 Call to the Post -- During each pregame show, a solo trumpeter plays Call to the Post into a microphone to be heard throughout the stadium. This is a reference to the city of Louisville's long history with horse racing as the Call to the Post tune is customarily played by a bugler just minutes before a horse race. There is usually a second playing of this, occurring just before the start of the second half of the football game by the same trumpeter that played it during pregame. 
 Card March - About 2 hours before every home game, the drumline leads the football team to the stadium gates where the band and colorguard await ready to play a string of school songs.
 The annual Cardinal Marching Band Banquet near the end of the football season in order to celebrate the journey from band camp to the end of the regular season. The banquet includes recognition of all Senior members who are presented a CMB Alumni Pin, announcement of the coveted "Section of the Year" designation, and a slideshow of the year's performances.

Performances

Kentucky Derby Festival

Pegasus Parade
During the Kentucky Derby Festival, the band has two events that it participates in annually. The first of which is the Pegasus Parade, held in downtown Louisville two days before the Kentucky Derby. It is one of the largest parades in the United States. The band marches the parade among all the other floats and attractions while playing fight songs, both representing the University of Louisville and the city of Louisville itself.

Kentucky Derby

The second of these events is the Kentucky Derby itself at historic Churchill Downs. The band routinely plays in between the various races held on Derby day, usually alternating play times with a military band. Its greatest honor every year takes place minutes before the big race—the playing of the Stephen Foster classic "My Old Kentucky Home" near the Derby Winner's Circle for all those in attendance and for those that watch on television. The band first played the song at the Derby in 1936, by which time it was established as the music played while the horses are led to the post parade. It has kept this engagement for all but a few years since then. In 2002, famed trumpeter Wynton Marsalis joined the band for this honor. In 1998, Dr. Frederick A. Speck (the UofL director of bands and a composer in his own right) wrote an arrangement of My Old Kentucky Home that the marching band has since played for this and many other occasions.

The Louisville Orchestra
For years, the UofL Marching Band has carried a relationship with the Louisville Orchestra. The first concert of the Orchestra's season is called Fanfara—held at The Kentucky Center for the Performing Arts in September every year. The marching band is featured as the opening act, usually entering and exiting to a drum cadence but stopping to play The Star-Spangled Banner while on stage. The playing of the American national anthem appropriately kicks off the Orchestra's season of wonderful live music.

KMEA State Marching Championships
Since 2007, when the competition returned to Louisville after a long drought without it, band members have assisted the Kentucky Music Educators Association (KMEA) in hosting the semi-finals and finals of Kentucky State Marching Band Championships at Cardinal Stadium. Band members take on various jobs for the day, from being a band guide to being a press box assistant and more. At the end of the competition, the UofL Drumline (ULD) plays a series of cadences as all of the finalist bands reenter the stadium for the trophy ceremony.

Patrick Henry Hughes

In 2006, trumpeter Patrick Henry Hughes joined the Cardinal Marching Band. Patrick was a young man who had been born without eyes and, furthermore, was reliant on a wheelchair, unable to walk. Patrick would play trumpet while his father (Patrick John Hughes) pushed him in his wheelchair through the marching drills. This visible commitment attracted increasing crowd and media attention throughout the fall football season, and the pair of Patricks were featured in a variety of television and newspaper coverage.

Extreme Makeover: Home Edition
In November 2007, at the suggestion of a member of the CMB, ABC's Extreme Makeover: Home Edition came to Louisville to remake Hughes' family home. As part of a community project that the show routinely does at the suggestion of the recipient of the home makeover, the band's practice field was given a makeover. The show filmed at two CMB rehearsals—one rehearsal on the old field and one rehearsal at the unveiling of the new field. New lights and a new sound system were installed for better practice conditions. Other additions to the new field include a new shed for the storage of both instruments and equipment, a roofed sitting area to escape the sun's heat, and water fountains to hydrate the band members. The new field is fenced off and has a tall gate that displays the name of the field: "Patrick Henry Hughes Field".

Music

CDs

The marching band has released two CD recordings.

In 1991, the UofL Cardinal Marching Band was among the first marching bands to release a recording on CD. Recorded at the Kentucky Center for the Arts in November 1990, the CMB performed charts and percussion features from the landmark 1990–91 football season that culminated with Coach Howard Schnellenberger leading the Cardinals to an historic victory over Alabama in the 1991 Sunkist Fiesta Bowl in Tempe, Ariz.

The second was 2007 Highlights. The CD was engineered and recorded by Christopher Jones and Tim Haertel. It was produced by TNT Productions, Inc.

See also
 UofL Cardinal Bird Mascot
 The University of Louisville Collegiate Chorale
 The University of Louisville Cardinal Singers

References

External links
 

Atlantic Coast Conference marching bands
Marching Band
Musical groups established in 1928
Musical groups from Louisville, Kentucky
1928 establishments in Kentucky